Charles Shepard may refer to:

 Charles Biddle Shepard (1808–1843), Congressional Representative from North Carolina
 Charles C. Shepard (1914–1985), American microbiologist
 Charles Upham Shepard (1804–1886), American mineralogist and chemist
 Charles E. Shepard (1868-1932), American architect based in Kansas City with initials C.E.S., including for design of Charles S. Keith House.

See also
Clarence Erasmus Shepard (1869-1949), also an American architect based in Kansas City with initials C.E.S.